Feuerdrachen was an Eastern German television espionage series produced by the DEFA.

See also
List of German television series

External links
 

1981 German television series debuts
1981 German television series endings
Espionage television series
German-language television shows
Television in East Germany